The Crompton Loom Works is an historic industrial complex of the Crompton Corporation at 132-142 Green Street in Worcester, Massachusetts.  The factory manufactured looms for textile factories. With its original portion dating to 1860, the complex is one of the oldest surviving industrial sites in the city.  The facility was established by George Crompton, whose father William had invented the first power loom for weaving fancy fabrics.  The younger Crompton's business would become of the most significant employers in the city, and his innovative looms would revolutionize the textile industry.  Crompton and his successors would operate the loom manufacturing works at Green Street well into the 1960s.  The manufacturing capabilities on the site were applied to producing can packaging machines and bowling pinsetters. Capabilities at the Green Street facility included machining, drop hammer forging, a cast iron foundry (which also produced ductile and malleable iron castings), wood working . and pattern making, along with a materials testing lab.. The building has subsequently been adapted to other uses.  The complex was listed on the National Register of Historic Places in 1980, and included as part of the Blackstone Canal Historic District in 1995.

The Crompton Loom Works is located south of downtown Worcester, at the junction Green and Harrison Streets.  It is a complex of connected brick buildings, ranging in height from one to three stories.  The building's style is industrial Italianate, with quoined building corners and corbelling on the eave of the main tower.  Most windows are rectangular, but there are several in an older section that are set in round-arch openings.  When first built, the main building was only two stories tall, and was altered several times, with the tower and third floor added in the 1880s.

See also
 Crompton Mill Historic District
 Crompton-Shenandoah Plant
 National Register of Historic Places listings in northwestern Worcester, Massachusetts

References

Buildings and structures in Worcester, Massachusetts
Industrial buildings and structures on the National Register of Historic Places in Massachusetts
Italianate architecture in Massachusetts
Industrial buildings completed in 1860
National Register of Historic Places in Worcester, Massachusetts
Historic district contributing properties in Massachusetts
Chemtura
Weaving equipment